Vejdovskyella is a genus of annelids, belonging to the family Naididae.

The genus was described in 1903 by W. Michaelsen.

Species:
 Vejdovskyella baicalensis Semernoy, 1994
 Vejdovskyella comata (Vejdovský, 1883)
 Vejdovskyella dilucida Snimschikova, 1987
 Vejdovskyella galinae Semernoy, 1994
 Vejdovskyella intermedia (Bretscher, 1896)
 Vejdovskyella koshovi (Sokolskaya, 1962)
 Vejdovskyella macrochaeta (Lastočkin, 1921)
 Vejdovskyella margaritae Semernoy, 1994
 Vejdovskyella schizodentata Semernoy, 1982
 Vejdovskyella simplex Liang, 1958
 Vejdovskyella sublitoralis Semernoy, 1994

References

Tubificina